Latrobe City Stadium is a multi purpose sport stadium located in Morwell, Victoria, Australia. Opened in 1991,
today it is the home ground of the Falcons 2000 SC in the Latrobe Valley Soccer League, and is used for soccer, rugby league and rugby union.

It was previously the home ground of the defunct Gippsland Falcons during their tenure in the National Soccer League, and briefly in the Victoria Premier League. The Melbourne Rising rugby union club previously hosted a number of National Rugby Championship matches at the stadium. The stadium is also the headquarters of the Gippsland Cricket League and features Football Federation Victoria approved lights, a function room and bar and a soccer shop. In 1995, a new stand was built, bringing the total seating capacity of the stadium to 1,912.

Notable fixtures
The stadium held a Victorian Premier League match in 2008 between the Australian Institute of Sport and Oakleigh Cannons, as well as several Victorian Women's Premier League matches during the same year.

On 8 July 2010, the venue held an A-League practice match between Melbourne Heart and Newcastle Jets. Newcastle won the match 2–1 in front of 3,000 spectators. On 13 November 2010, Falcons Park was host to the Melbourne Victory Women when they played Sydney FC Women in Round 2 of the W-League. Sydney FC beat Melbourne Victory 4–1.

The venue hosted an A-League "Regional Round" clash between Melbourne Heart and Wellington Phoenix on 4 December 2011. Melbourne Heart won the match 1–0 with Mate Dugandzic scoring in the 41st minute. 2,951 people attended the game.

The stadium will be upgraded to host the rugby sevens events at 2026 Commonwealth Games.

Attendance records

References

External links

Sports venues in Victoria (Australia)
Soccer venues in Victoria (Australia)
Rugby league stadiums in Australia
Rugby union stadiums in Australia
Morwell, Victoria